Tatsuyuki (written: 達之, 達行, 龍雪 or 龍之) is a masculine Japanese given name. Notable people with the name include:

, Japanese composer and sound designer
, Japanese anime director
, Japanese footballer
, Japanese footballer
, Japanese baseball player

Japanese masculine given names